Thomas Hylton "Bill" Collins (11 July 1931 – 3 March 2021) was a British baker who, with George Elton and Norman Chamberlain, developed the Chorleywood bread process at the British Baking Industries Research Association in Chorleywood.  He was awarded the Queen Elizabeth II Silver Jubilee Medal in 1978.

Works
 The Creation and Control of Bread Crumb Structure

References

1931 births
2021 deaths
British bakers
People from Bootle